This article is about the particular significance of the year 1936 to Wales and its people.

Incumbents

Archbishop of Wales – Charles Green, Bishop of Bangor
Archdruid of the National Eisteddfod of Wales
Gwili (outgoing)
J.J. (incoming)

Events
20 January - Edward, Prince of Wales, accedes to the throne as Edward VIII, King of the United Kingdom, following the death of his father King George V of the United Kingdom.
March - Jim Griffiths, later the first Secretary of State for Wales, is elected member for Llanelli following the death in office of the sitting MP.
May - Colonial Secretary Jimmy Thomas is forced to resign from politics after a scandal involving Stock Exchange dealings.
19 November - Dowlais Ironworks ceases steel production at its original Dowlais works. On a visit to the depressed areas of the South Wales Valleys King Edward VIII comments that "These works brought all these people here. Something should be done to get them at work again." The remark is much misquoted.
October - Saunders Lewis courts further controversy by appearing to praise Adolf Hitler.
unknown dates
Six men and one woman are jailed after an anti-Fascist demonstration at Tonypandy.
Of 118 men from the South Wales coalfield who enlist in the International Brigade, 34 are killed.
Treforest Trading Estate opens.

Arts and literature

Awards

National Eisteddfod of Wales (held in Fishguard)
National Eisteddfod of Wales: Chair - Simon B. Jones
National Eisteddfod of Wales: Crown - David Jones

New books

English language
Rex Barker - Christ In The Valley of Unemployment
Margiad Evans - Creed
Geraint Goodwin - The Heyday in the Blood
W. F. Grimes - The Megalithic Monuments of Wales
Bertrand Russell - Which Way to Peace?
Dylan Thomas - Twenty-five Poems, including "And death shall have no dominion"
Ethel Lina White - The Wheel Spins (The Lady Vanishes)

Welsh language
Ambrose Bebb - Crwydro'r Cyfandir
I. D. Hooson - Cerddi a Baledi
Kate Roberts (author) - Traed mewn cyffion

New drama
Saunders Lewis - Buchedd Garmon

Music
John Glyn Davies - Cerddi Portinllaen
Arwel Hughes - Fantasia for strings
Ivor Novello - Careless Rapture

Film
Visit of David Lloyd George to Germany (shot by David Lloyd George's private secretary)

Broadcasting

Sport
Rugby Union
14 March - Wales beats Ireland 3–0 at Cardiff Arms Park

Births
9 January - Mike Davies, tennis player and sports administrator (died 2015 in the United States)
7 February - Keith Rowlands, rugby union player and administrator (died 2006)
14 March - John Meirion Morris, sculptor (died 2020)
16 March - Vic Rouse, footballer
10 April - Ricky Valance, born David Spencer, pop singer (died 2020)
12 May - Phil Edwards, boxer
23 May - Jennifer Daniel, actress
27 June - Clive Thomas, football referee
6 July - Redvers Sangoe, light-heavyweight boxer (died 1964)
30 July - Haydn Morgan, Welsh international rugby union player
2 September - Gwyn Thomas, poet and academic (died 2016)
20 September - Andrew Davies, screenwriter
25 September - Michael Davies, Catholic writer (died 2004)
15 October - Timothy Stamps, Minister of Health in Zimbabwe (died 2017 in Zimbabwe)
7 November - Dame Gwyneth Jones, opera singer
18 November - Brian Huggett, golfer

Deaths
9 January
 David Phillips Jones, Wales international rugby player, 54 
 "Buller" Williams, Wales international rugby player
20 January - George V (Prince of Wales, 1901–1910), 70
7 February - John Henry Williams, sitting MP for Llanelli, 66 (pneumonia)
23 February - Harry Jones, Welsh-born prospector and politician in British Columbia, 95
20 March - William Napier Bruce, lawyer, 78
5 May - Percy Bennett, Wales international rugby player, 66
16 May - John Jenkins (Gwili), poet and archdruid, 63
13 June - William Elsey, Wales international rugby player, 65
3 August - John Alf Brown, Wales international rugby player, 54
2 September - William Rees, priest and writer, 77
28 October - George Barker, politician, 78
29 October - Dan Griffiths, Wales international rugby player, 79
11 November - Sir Edward German, English composer of Welsh descent, 71
15 December - Reese J. Llewellyn, Welsh-American businessman, 64

See also
1936 in Northern Ireland

References

 
Wales